Berkeley Madonna is a mathematical modelling software package, developed at the University of California at Berkeley by Robert Macey and George Oster.  It numerically solves ordinary differential equations and difference equations, originally developed to execute STELLA programs.

Its strength lies in a relatively simple syntax to define differential equations coupled with a simple yet powerful user interface. In particular, Berkeley Madonna provides the facility of putting parameters onto a slider that can in turn be moved by a user to change the value. Such visualizations enable quick assessments of whether or not a particular model class is suitable to describe the data to be analyzed and modeled, and, later, communicating models easily to other disciplines such as medical decision makers.

Uses
It has become a standard in the development and communication of pharmacometric models describing drug concentration and its effects in drug development

 
as well as modeling of physiological processes. 
A user community exists in the form of a LinkedIn user group with more than 750 members (February 2023).

The use of system dynamics modeling has expanded into other areas such as system physics, epidemiology, environmental health, and population ecology.

Versions
There are two versions of Berkeley Madonna: a free version with slightly limited functionality and a licensed version that is registered to individuals.

References

Further reading
 "Berkeley-Madonna Implementation of Ikeda's Model". pp. 582–585.

External links
 

Mathematical software